Mendota Juvenile Treatment Center  (MJTC) is a juvenile psychiatric facility  of the Wisconsin Department of Health Services, located in the Lorenz Hall Annex on the grounds of the Mendota Mental Health Institute (MMHI) in Madison, Wisconsin. It has space for 29 patients. The inmates at Mendota usually have anti-social personality disorders who do not feel empathy, guilt, nor remorse. It uses the Mendota Juvenile Treatment Center Program.

The impetus for the facility's creation was an increase in violent crime perpetrated by minors. It was established in 1995 by two psychologists, Michael Caldwell and Greg Van Rybroek. It was deliberately staffed with psychologists instead of regular prison guards; while most facilities for delinquent and criminal youth are operated by the Wisconsin Department of Corrections, MJTC is under the health services department instead.

Mendota Juvenile Treatment Center Program (MJTC) is an intensive mental health intervention for violent and treatment resistant youth in juvenile detention.

Summary
The MJTC treatment program was developed for and implemented in the Mendota Juvenile Treatment Center in 1995. The Mendota Juvenile Treatment Center is a secured correctional facility located on the grounds of the Mendota Mental Health Institute in Madison, Wisconsin. It is operated as a secured correctional facility through the department of corrections, but housed on the grounds of a State mental health facility. Youth who are transferred to MJTC are selected by the staff of juvenile corrections institutions due to their failure to respond to the traditional rehabilitative programming provided in correctional institutions, nearly always because of their excessively violent and/or disruptive behavior. While MJTC was not designed to treat psychopathy per se ((cite web https://www.realclearscience.com/blog/2014/07/can_psychopaths_be_cured.html )), many of the youth in the original treatment sample do have high levels of psychopathic traits.

Treatment features 
The MJTC program is based on the theory of defiance and the social control theory. The theory of defiance can be used to describe a subgroup of offenders who react to punishments for crimes by increasing the frequency or seriousness of violent or other criminal behavior. Further punishment becomes cyclical as the youth's behavior continues to worsen in reaction to increasingly severe punishments. The cycle further isolates the youth from conventional goals and values and he/she becomes "compressed" or "trapped" into an increasingly defiant behavior pattern. The social control theory posits that when the social bonds that connect the youth to conventional society are strained, delinquency arises. For delinquent youth, barriers have developed that restrict the youth's ability and desire to form conventional and productive social bonds, which in turn facilitates increased antisocial behavior. These patterns of antisocial behavior, even in the face of punishment, and have prevented this subgroup of antisocial youth from engaging in traditional rehabilitative programs in the juvenile correctional system.

MJTC uses a variation of the decompression treatment model and aggression replacement cognitive-behavioral treatment. Primary themes of the program include helping youth accept responsibility for their behavior, resolving mental health issues, and helping to build positive relationships with families. The MJTC program focuses on helping youth develop appropriate social skills, and to help youth replace delinquent associations and behaviors with pro-social relationships and activities. In so doing, the aim of MJTC is to break the compression cycle of increasing antagonistic, violent and antisocial defiance of authority and to replace it with appropriate pro-social bonds.

MJTC also uses a behavioral point system called the Today-Tomorrow Program. The point system closely monitors and is highly responsive to changes in the youth's behavior. Through the point system, youth earn privileges for periods of positive behavior https://www.realclearscience.com/blog/2014/07/can_psychopaths_be_cured.html . Youth receive points at the end of the day based on their behavior and engagement in the treatment, and these points determine privileges for the following day. In addition to daily privileges, youth can earn additional, increasing privileges such as computer game time, snacks or private music, for accumulating points over several days. The Today-Tomorrow program incentivizes treatment compliance and appropriate behavior by rewarding pro-social behavior with increasingly desirable privileges.

In addition to individual therapy guided by the decompression model and the Today-Tomorrow Program, MJTC further assists youth by providing educational services, and group based therapy covering topics such as anger management, substance abuse, social skills, and problem solving.

MJTC is smaller and more intensive than standard juvenile corrections institutions. The original MJTC is about half the size of JCI units. Similarly, the ratio of clinical staff to residents is about twice that of more typical juvenile corrections units, allowing MJTC to  provide much greater treatment resources to antisocial youth. Staff at MJTC consists of 1 psychiatrist on staff for every 28 youth, one psychologist for every 26 youth, one social worker for every 14 youth, and a psychiatric nurse. Each youth in MJTC participates in several weekly individual counseling sessions with a psychologist, psychiatrist, or social worker. The average length of time in treatment at MJTC ranges from 45 to 83 weeks.

In standard juvenile correction institutions, mental health professionals are not assigned to specific JCI units. Experienced security staff, with little formal mental health training supervise units. The youth to psychologist ratios in standard JCI's is approximately 75 to 1. Psychiatric services typically occur in a clinic format by a part-time contracted psychiatrist. These part-time psychiatrists can have a caseload of up to 500 youth.

Efficacy 

Research has found MJTC to be more efficacious at treating institutionalized youth than standard JCI rehabilitation programs. The program had the greatest impact on serious violent offenses, reducing the risk of their incidence by about half. Youth in the treatment group were more than 6 times less likely to engage in felony violence than the comparison group youth, and had longer periods of time in the community before the first re-offense. Although their general recidivism rates were similar, only one fifth of the MJTC-treated youths were involved in institutional or community violence within 2 years after release, compared to approximately half of the comparison cases. Furthermore the length of treatment in MJTC significantly predicted improvement in interpersonal functioning and behavioral control.

Dissemination 
The MJTC program has been adopted and adapted by four other sites, including adjudicated female youth, youth held for a short stay, and individuals committed under the Wisconsin Sexually Violent Persons Law. As of 2010, approximately 800 juveniles and 100 adults have been treated with MJTC.

Due to the intensive nature of the program, and the high ratio of mental health professionals to youth, the costs of the MJTC program are more than double that of treatment as usual at standard JCI's. However, because participation in the program typically results in a shorter length of stay, overall correctional costs increase only 4.5%, or by approximately $7,000 per youth. Furthermore, the improved treatment progress and lowered recidivism, especially for the most violent crimes, suggests that while the initial costs of the treatment are higher, the long term costs of repeated and longer prison sentences, and physical and emotional harm to society may be far greater. In fact, one study reported that the MJTC treatment program yielded a benefit-cost ratio of more than 7 to 1 over treatment as usual.

Implementation materials including training, support, and participant worksheets and handouts can be obtained from the developer. However, step-by-step implementation guidance is not provided. A criticism of the implementation materials for the MJTC program is that many of the participant handouts assume a high level of reading comprehension for youth.

References

External links
 Mendota Juvenile Treatment Center - Wisconsin Department of Health Services

Buildings and structures in Madison, Wisconsin
Psychiatric hospitals in Wisconsin
1995 establishments in Wisconsin
Mental health organizations in Wisconsin
Organizations based in Madison, Wisconsin